The following is a list of notable events that have happened in 2012 in music in Australia.

Events

January
Big Day Out 2012 was held in Sydney, Melbourne, Perth, Adelaide and the Gold Coast, headlined by Soundgarden (in all venues) and Kanye West (in Sydney, Melbourne and the Gold Coast).

February
 2012 Soundwave (Australian music festival) music festival took place. The line-up consisted of 95 musicians and music groups.

March
Hermitude's HyperParadise won the 2012 Australian Music Prize

April

May

June

July
 Splendour in the Grass 2012 is held at the North Byron Parklands in Yelgun, New South Wales, headlined by Jack White, Bloc Party and The Smashing Pumpkins.

August

September

October

November
ARIA Music Awards of 2012 was an award ceremony to acknowledged Australian musicians on musical achievements.
Yothu Yindi was inducted into the ARIA Hall of Fame.
Stereosonic was held in Brisbane, Adelaide, Perth, Sydney, and Melbourne. It is an annual music festival that features electronic dance musicians.

December

Albums and Singles

January

February

March

April

May

June
The Presets released their single Youth in Trouble.

July

August
The Presets released their single Ghosts.

September

October

November

December

Deaths
January 21 – Jodie-Anne White, Australian dancer and choreographer (b. 1967)

See also
List of number-one singles of 2012 (Australia)
List of number-one albums of 2012 (Australia)

References

 
Australian music
Australian